The House of Frankopan was a Croatian noble family.

Frankopan may also refer to:

 MT Frankopan, Croatian crude oil tanker
 Frankopan Castle, located in Krk, Croatia

See also

 Frangipani family, a powerful Roman patrician clan in the Middle Ages